Mikhail Ivanovich Mikhaylov (27 October 1858 – 6 October 1929) was a well-known Russian opera singer (tenor). He graduated from the Moscow Conservatory. At first, he sang in Kiev and Tiflis, and, between 1884 and 1896, on the Imperial operatic stage in Saint Petersburg.

He possessed a sonorous and tender voice, and excelled at singing in his upper range. He sang the roles of Raul (Les Huguenots), Radames (Aida), Roland (Esclarmonde), Prince (Rusalka), title role in Faust, and many other operas in the Russian repertoire.

Russian composer Anton Rubinstein dedicated one of his many songs, "Autumn" (1891), to Mikhaylov.

References

External links 
Entry for Mikhail Ivanovich Mikhaylov at The world of words: Biographical Dictionary (in Russian)

1858 births
1929 deaths
Russian operatic tenors
Moscow Conservatory alumni
19th-century male opera singers from the Russian Empire
20th-century Russian male opera singers